Wilhelm "Roman" Bannwart (2 November 1919, in Gossau – 2 April 2010, in Einsiedeln) was a Swiss theologian, priest, and musician.

Works
Best of Gregorianik, Berlin: Universal Music, 2004 	
Instrumentalmusik über die sieben letzten Worte unseres Erlösers am Kreuze. Fassung Vl 1 2 Va Vc, Kassel: Disco-Center, [2000] 	
The world of Gregorian chant, Merenberg: Zyx Music, 1996 	
Die Botschaft der Mönche – Gregorianische Gesänge, Hamburg: Polygram, 1995
Der gregorianische Choral zwischen Kirche und Disco, Düsseldorf: Patmos-Verlag, 1995
Missa in festo Pentecostes, Zurich: Jecklin, 1988
Musica Unterwaldensis, Zurich: Musikverlag zum Pelikan, 1978

References

External links
 Literature about Roman Bannwart in the catalog of the German National Library

1919 births
2010 deaths
People from the canton of St. Gallen
20th-century Swiss Roman Catholic priests
20th-century Swiss Roman Catholic theologians
20th-century Swiss musicians
21st-century Swiss musicians